The Administrative Tribunal of the International Labour Organization, shortened ILO Administrative Tribunal or ILOAT, is a tribunal for conflicts of employees and their employer in intergovernmental organisations. The tribunal was established as the "Administrative Tribunal of the League of Nations" in 1927 by the League of Nations and transferred (and renamed) to the International Labour Organization in 1946. Labour-related decisions of 60 international organisations can be appealed to at ILOAT.

Judges
As of June 2020, the tribunal was composed as follows:
Patrick Frydman, president
Dolores M. Hansen, vice-president
Giuseppe Barbagallo
Michael Francis Moore
Hugh Anthony Rawlins
Fatoumata Diakité
Yves Kreins

Judgments
As of 12 August 2019, ILO has issued over 3900 judgements. The organisations in relation to which most decisions were issued are:

References

External links
Official site

 
International administrative tribunals
International Labour Organization